Tristram Shaw (May 23, 1786 – March 14, 1843) was a United States representative from New Hampshire.  He was born in Hampton, New Hampshire in 1786. He completed preparatory studies there.

Shaw held several local offices in Exeter, New Hampshire before he was elected as a Democrat to the Twenty-sixth and Twenty-seventh Congresses (March 4, 1839 – March 3, 1843). He died in Exeter in 1843, shortly after leaving Congress, and was buried in Bride Hill Cemetery in Hampton.

References

External links 
 

1786 births
1843 deaths
People from Hampton, New Hampshire
Democratic Party members of the United States House of Representatives from New Hampshire
19th-century American politicians